The KL Sports City (formerly known as Bukit Jalil National Sports Complex; Kompleks Sukan Negara in Malay) in Malaysia is the largest sports complex in the country. It is located in Bukit Jalil, 20 km south of Kuala Lumpur. Described as the "sports complex in a park", it was the only one of its kind in the country or region when it was fully developed. It was officially inaugurated by the then-Prime Minister of Malaysia Mahathir Mohamad on 11 July 1998 ahead of the 1998 Commonwealth Games in which it staged the Games' opening ceremony. The complex was upgraded to KL Sports City in 2017 for the 2017 Southeast Asian Games.

Access
The complex is accessible via Shah Alam Expressway, Puchong–Sungai Besi Highway, Maju Expressway and Kuala Lumpur–Seremban Expressway. It is also served by the Bukit Jalil LRT station.

Features
 A main arch to the National Stadium with pool fountains
 A keris, Malay dagger at the entrance of National Stadium which symbolizes the warrior spirit of sportsmanship.

List of structures and amenities

Stadiums

 Bukit Jalil National Stadium
 Axiata Arena (formerly Putra Indoor Stadium)
 National Hockey Stadium
 National Aquatic Centre
 National Squash Centre

Parks
 Bukit Komanwel (Commonwealth Hill)
 Family Park
 Bukit Jalil Golf and Country Club

Miscellaneous

National Sports Council Headquarters
Bukit Jalil Sports School
Bukit Jalil LRT station
Vista Komanwel (formerly used as 1998 Commonwealth Games village)
Vista Komanwel Shopping Centre

Notable events
 2017 - 2017 ASEAN Para Games
 2017 - 2017 Southeast Asian Games
 2011 - Liverpool F.C. Asia Tour 2011
 2011 - Chelsea 2011 summer tour of Asia
 2011 - Arsenal 2011 Pre-Season Tour
 2010 - 2010 AFF Suzuki Cup First Leg of the Finals
 2009–present - 	ATP World Tour 250 Malaysian Open (tennis)
 2009 - 2009 ASEAN Para Games
 2009 - Manchester United Asia Tour 2009
 2007 - 2007 Asian Cup
 2007 - Champions Youth Cup 2007
 2006 - 2006 FESPIC Games
 2003 - FA Premier League Asia Cup 2003
 2001 - 2001 ASEAN Para Games
 2001 - 2001 Southeast Asian Games
 2001 - Manchester United Asia Tour 2001
 1998–present - Malaysia Cup Final
 1998–present - Malaysian FA Cup Final
 1998 - XVI Commonwealth Games, Kuala Lumpur

See also
 Bukit Kiara Sports Complex
 Stadium Merdeka
 Stadium Negara

References

External links
 Official website
 Official KL Sports City Website

Sports venues in Kuala Lumpur
1998 establishments in Malaysia